Belle is a surname. Notable people with the Belle surname:

 Alexis Simon Belle (1674–1734), French portrait artist
 Albert Belle (born 1966), American retired Major League Baseball player
 Anne Belle (1935–2003), documentary filmmaker
 Anomie Belle, American singer, musician, composer and social activist
 Camilla Belle (born 1986), American actress
 Cortez Belle (born 1983), English footballer
 David Belle (born 1973), French founder of Parkour, actor, film choreographer and stunt coordinator
 Dido Elizabeth Belle  (1761–1804) born a slave and great-niece of Lord Mansfield
 Ekkehardt Belle (1954-2022), German television actor
 Erika Belle (born 1956), Dutch chess master
 Gerard van Belle (born 1968), American astronomer
 Henri Belle (born January 25, 1989), Cameroonian footballer
 Regina Belle (born 1963), American singer and songwriter
 Shawn Belle (born 1985), Canadian hockey player
 Sharon Belle (born 1993), Canadian actress
 Tia-Adana Belle (born 1996), Barbadian athlete

See also
 Sweetie Belle, character in My Little Pony